USS Shubrick may refer to the following ships of the United States Navy:

 , a steamer transferred to the Navy Department 23 August 1861; returned by the Revenue Cutter Service to the Lighthouse Board in 1866
 , a torpedo boat commissioned 1901; renamed Coast Torpedo Boat No. 15, 1901; decommissioned, 1919
 , a Clemson-class destroyer commissioned in 1919; transferred to the Royal Navy where she served as HMS Ripley
 , a Gleaves-class destroyer commissioned in 1943 and decommissioned in 1945

United States Navy ship names